The 136th Civil Engineer Squadron (136 CES) is a unit of the 136th Airlift Wing, Texas Air National Guard, Texas Military Forces stationed at Naval Air Station Fort Worth Joint Reserve Base, Fort Worth, Texas. If activated to federal service, the Squadron is gained by the United States Air Force Air Mobility Command.

Lineage
 
Constituted as 136th Civil Engineering Flight on 1 October 1969 
Assignment to National Guard Bureau on 1 October 1969
Extended Federal Recognition on 1 November 1969 
Assigned to Texas Air National Guard on 1 November 1969
Assigned to 136th Tactical Airlift Wing on 1 November 1969
Stationed at Naval Air Station Dallas, Hensley Field on 1 November 1969
Re-Designated as 136th Civil Engineering Squadron on 1 July 1985
Assigned to Air Combat Command on 1 October 1993
Re-Designated as 136th Civil Engineer Squadron on 1 March 1994
Assigned to Air Mobility Command on 1 April 1997
Stationed at Naval Air Station Fort Worth Joint Reserve Base on 27 April 1999

Decorations
 Air Force Outstanding Unit Award
1972 (1 May 1969 – 30 Apr 1977) (136ARW)
1985 (1 Jan 1980 – 1 Aug 1982) (136CEF)
1985 (1 Jan 1983 – 31 Dec 1984) (136AW)
1991 (1 Sep 1989 – 1 Jun 1991) (136AW)
2009 (1 Oct 2006 – 30 Sep 2008) (136CES)
2015 (1 Oct 2012 – 30 Sep 2014) (136AW)
 Texas Governor's Unit Citation

References

Squadrons of the United States Air National Guard
Civil engineering
Engineering squadrons of the United States Air Force
Military units and formations in Texas
Texas Military Forces